The sixth season of the American horror anthology television series American Horror Story, subtitled Roanoke, follows supernatural experiences around a haunted house and its surroundings in North Carolina. The first half of the season is presented as a paranormal documentary entitled My Roanoke Nightmare, which reenacts the experiences of a married couple who lived in the house. The second half is presented as found footage and depicts the doomed production of the documentary's sequel. The ensemble cast includes Kathy Bates, Sarah Paulson, Cuba Gooding Jr., Lily Rabe, André Holland, Denis O'Hare, Wes Bentley, Evan Peters, Cheyenne Jackson, and Angela Bassett, with all returning from previous seasons, except Gooding Jr. and Holland.

Created by Ryan Murphy and Brad Falchuk for cable network FX, the series is produced by 20th Century Fox Television. Roanoke was broadcast between September 14 to November 16, 2016, consisting of 10 episodes and marking the first time the series premiered outside of October. Before the premiere, Murphy stated the sixth season would be "more rogue" and "dark" in contrast to its predecessor, Hotel. Details about its plot and cast were kept secret until the first episode aired, an unusual approach to publicity for the series. As such, it became the first iteration of the series to not release a subtitle before the season premiere. Several potential themes were theorized based on various promotional material produced by FX. After the release of pictures taken from the set in Santa Clarita, it was widely speculated that the season would incorporate the infamous 1580s Roanoke Colony disappearance.

Roanoke has received mostly positive reviews, with critics noting its subdued aesthetic and pacing compared to earlier seasons. The second half of the season was met with mixed criticism.

Cast and characters

Main

 Kathy Bates as Thomasin White / The Butcher and Agnes Mary Winstead
 Sarah Paulson as Shelby Miller, Audrey Tindall, and Lana Winters 
 Cuba Gooding Jr. as Matt Miller and Dominic Banks
 Lily Rabe as Shelby Miller
 André Holland as Matt Miller
 Denis O'Hare as Dr. Elias Cunningham and William van Henderson
 Wes Bentley as Ambrose White and Dylan
 Evan Peters as Edward Philipe Mott and Rory Monahan
 Cheyenne Jackson as Sidney Aaron James
 Angela Bassett as Lee Harris and Monet Tumusiime

Recurring
 Adina Porter as Lee Harris
 Lady Gaga as Scathach 
 Leslie Jordan as Cricket Marlowe and Ashley Gilbert
 Simone Baker and Saniyya Sidney as Flora Harris 
 Chaz Bono as Lot Polk and Brian Wells 
 Estelle Hermansen and Savannah Liles as Priscilla
 Maya Rose Berko as Nurse Miranda Jane 
 Kristen Rakes as Nurse Bridget Jane 
 Charles Malik Whitfield and Joe Alvarez as Mason Harris 
 Frederick Koehler as Lot Polk

Guest stars
 Frances Conroy and Robin Weigert as Mama Polk
 Doris Kearns Goodwin as herself 
 Henderson Wade as Guinness 
 Shannon Lucio as Diana Cross
 Finn Wittrock as Jether Polk
 Jacob Artist as Todd Allan Connors
 Taissa Farmiga as Sophie Green
 Jon Bass as Milo 
 Emma Bell as Tracy Logan 
 James Morosini as Bob Kinnaman  
 Trixie Mattel as herself

Episodes

Production

Development

On November 10, 2015, the network renewed the series for a sixth cycle; which premiered on September 14, 2016. In August 2015, co-creator Ryan Murphy commented on the sixth year, stating, "The next thing we're crafting up is very very different than [Hotel], not smaller. But just not opulent. More rogue and more dark." In October 2015, when questioned about clues and hints alluding to the sixth season (as has been the status quo since the first season of the series) in Hotel, Murphy revealed he had yet to definitively decide on a theme, "This is an interesting year in that the idea that we're dealing with I've mentioned in several seasons. It's been there before. We've actually talked about it a lot on the show. I might do that for season 7 but I'm leaning towards that for season 6." In January 2016, FX president John Landgraf revealed that the season will be "principally set in the present", with a dual timeline in "echoes of the past". He also confirmed a fall 2016 premiere. At the 2016 PaleyFest, Murphy divulged that the two previous ideas [the writers] had been considering had been merged into season six, saying it will involve children and operatic themes. The season will consist of 10 episodes, the least in a given cycle, in the show's history; with the finale scheduled to air November 16, 2016. On September 1, 2016, it was reported by Entertainment Weekly that the season was possibly subtitled The Mist, as a Rotten Tomatoes page and TV Guide magazine had printed; which was later proven untrue. There is a direct connection to Freak Show with an exploration of the Mott family origin.

In a late September issue of Entertainment Weekly, Falchuk and Murphy revealed there would be a major twist coming to the series in "Chapter 6". Murphy said of the matter, "You'll see starting in episode 6, the show has a huge turn, and the thing that you think you're watching is not what you're watching, It's a hat on a hat on a hat on a hat that we've had to protect." Falchuk added, "No matter what you think it is, it's not that. Then, episode 6 comes, and you're like, 'Wait! What happened?' It's like [episodes] 1–5, 6–9, and 10 is its own thing." Murphy went on to confirm the turn in the season being a behind-the-camera look at the production of the faux-documentary My Roanoke Nightmare. He also stated that the final episode will feature characters, and their mythologies, that will continue on in the overall series.

Set design
Colonial ware and design are incorporated into the season, which is theorized to be, at least partially, set in 1590 Roanoke, North Carolina. A pioneer cottage is incorporated in Santa Clarita, California. The set is fully dressed in time-period appropriate dressings, including an etched tree. The production designers constructed an entire colonial house that serves as the season's chief setting. The house was constructed in an undisclosed California forest over four months. The abode is completely functional, furnished, and finished inside and out. This is the first time in American Horror Story history that a complete home has been built, and it is quite unprecedented for film and television productions in general. A three-story set built in Malibu Canyon was not permitted properly, and after being torn down in October 2016, FX "will be required to do extensive restoration."

Casting
In October 2015, Murphy tweeted that he had asked Lady Gaga to join the untitled season, but did not expect an answer anytime soon. She later confirmed her involvement in March 2016. Emma Roberts had stated that she and Murphy have talked about a "devilish" role for her in the season. Despite this, Roberts did not appear in the season. Taissa Farmiga was heavily rumored to be involved with the season in some form. Murphy later confirmed that Farmiga would appear late in the season. In February 2016, Angela Bassett confirmed her return to the series during an interview on Larry King Now, being the first cast member added to the season 6 roster. She portrays Monet Tumusiime, a re-enactor of the documentary's horrific events. At PaleyFest, Murphy invited Kathy Bates, Denis O'Hare, Sarah Paulson, Finn Wittrock, Cheyenne Jackson, Wes Bentley, and Matt Bomer to return to the show for its sixth season. In May 2016, Jessica Lange stated in an interview with Charlie Rose, that she would not be returning for the sixth or any other future season of the series; saying, "No, I had four years with that, four seasons, and each year was a marvelous character, everything changed from one year to another which made it very interesting to me. But no, I think sometimes you come to the end of something... 

In June 2016, Leslie Jordan, who appeared in Coven, announced his return to the series, stating he had been approached to appear in Freak Show, but declined. He was surprised to get a call from Murphy again. Later in the month, Bomer, Jackson, and Evan Peters confirmed their involvement with the sixth season. O'Hare stated he would return in some capacity in a May 2016 interview. Us Weekly has reported the returns of Bentley, Bates, and Wittrock. In an early August 2016 interview with Glamour, series veteran Sarah Paulson announced her return for the sixth year. She said of the show, "I just think I have the greatest job on the planet because my TV show [American Horror Story] is going into its sixth season and I'm playing an entirely different character, like nothing I've ever played." She plays the featured re-enactor in the horrific documentary. On Halloween 2016, Murphy announced the return of Paulson's Asylum character, Lana Winters. TMZ reported the casting of The People v. O. J. Simpson: American Crime Story actor Cuba Gooding Jr. Gooding Jr. himself later went on to confirm his presence in the season, also announcing that he will share most screen-time with co-star Paulson, stating, "It's really been a treat to finally engage with her on camera, because when we did The People v. O. J. it was more about my scenes and then her scenes and us being in the courtroom but separate, but we're not separate no more!" He plays the co-lead of the My Roanoke Nightmare documentary. In September 2016, Jacob Artist announced his involvement with the sixth season. In the same month, the main casting was announced after the first episode with the addition of André Holland and series veteran Lily Rabe portraying the real-life couple, Matt Miller (Lee's brother) and his wife Shelby from the documentary's interviews. Adina Porter, after a small guest appearance on an episode of Murder House, portrayed the real Lee Harris.

Filming
In March 2016, the series received a major tax credit for filming of the season in Los Angeles, California. Cast member Angela Bassett, along with Jennifer Lynch, Marita Grabiak, Gwyneth Horder-Payton, Elodie Keene, and Alexis Korycinski were set as directors during the season, marking the first time women have served in the capacity on the show. In June 2016, cast member Jackson stated that the season had already clandestinely begun principal photography earlier that month. On August 1, 2016, TMZ published photographs of the American Horror Story set in Santa Clarita, California; that consists of a small Pioneer home, and a tree with the word "Croatoan" carved into its center. Both of these things are attributed to the 1590 colony of 117 people, in Roanoke, North Carolina, that disappeared without a trace, and the only clue left was the carving – the name being a nearby island and tribe of Native Americans. Later, TMZ unveiled more set photos from an unknown California forest.

Marketing

Campaign

The marketing campaign for the season was one of mystery. On June 6, 2016, all of the series' social media pages displayed a teaser image of a red number six, with a question mark superimposed. Little was known about plot details or casting before the premiere, which seems to be a deliberate ploy of publicity. The following months saw a virtual reality experience at the 2016 San Diego Comic-Con International, a multitude of motley teaser trailers and posters, a Mercedes-Benz sweepstakes; and no casting or plot announcements. At the Television Critics Association Summer Press Tour, on August 9, 2016, FX chief John Landgraf announced that all, but one, of the teaser trailers released thus far, have been deliberate misdirects by the network. Explaining, "[Murphy and Stephanie Gibbons, FX head of marketing and on-air promotions] went out and made many more trailers than you've actually seen for hypothetical seasons of American Horror Story, meaning different genres and different places". Landgraf also reiterated what had been previously reported, that the official theme of the cycle will not be revealed until the airing of the first episode.

A week before the premiere, FX released a trailer featuring Lady Gaga's new single "Perfect Illusion," speaking to the anonymity of the season. In a September 13, 2016 interview with The Hollywood Reporter, marketing chief Stephanie Gibbons spoke at length about the risks and idea behind the seasons complete anonymity. Explaining the origin of her campaign, "I felt we would play on two aspects of the human helix: Desire to know, the curiosity to find out what you don't know; and perhaps more importantly, the notion of how powerful withholding is to the human psyche. Often wanting is more fulfilling than having."

Reception

Critical response
American Horror Story: Roanoke received mostly positive reviews from critics. The review aggregator Rotten Tomatoes gave the season a 74% approval rating, with an average rating of 6.68/10, based on 15 reviews. The site's consensus reads, "American Horror Story: Roanoke takes a surprising turn away from prior AHS formats, revisiting the deliberate pace of earlier seasons on a spookier, smaller scale, even if the true-crime format feels overdone." On Metacritic, the season was given a score of 72 out of 100 based on 9 reviews, indicating "generally positive reviews", making it the best-reviewed season on that site.

Dan Fienberg of The Hollywood Reporter gave a positive review, writing, "When you're the type of show prone to kicking off a season with the introduction of a hairless mole man with a killer dildo, it's possible that the most provocative thing you can do to start a chapter is eschewing mole men, dildos and, in fact, killing altogether for a full week. The American Horror Story franchise has been and done many things, but it's never offered such a false sense of security, so this subdued start may be the scariest promise of all. It's the most curious I've been about future installments in a long time." Jeff Jensen of Entertainment Weekly also gave a positive review, writing, "The use of mystery to market the season may have been contrived, but at this point, mystery might also be the best thing going for it, too." Ben Travers of IndieWire called the premiere "a promising start with a central mystery as tantalizing as the ads teasing it."

Retrospective comments from Sarah Paulson 
In June 2021, Sarah Paulson was interviewed for Awards Chatter, a podcast from The Hollywood Reporter. During the interview, she expressed regret at having filmed the season, stating:Paulson was given the option not to appear in American Horror Story seventh season, entitled Cult. She ultimately chose to do the season, inspired by the provocative story, which explored the aftermath of the 2016 presidential election. Her comments about Roanoke were referenced in the seventh episode of American Horror Stories.

Awards and nominations

In its sixth season, the series has been nominated for 23 awards. 5 of them were won.

Ratings

 Live +7 ratings were not available, so Live +3 ratings have been used instead.

Home media

References

Notes 

 1.Paulson played Marcia Clark in The People v. O. J. Simpson: American Crime Story.

External links 

 
 

2016 American television seasons
2010s American drama television series
2010s American LGBT-related drama television series
2010s American mockumentary television series
American historical fiction
06
Cannibalism in fiction
Celtic mythology in popular culture
Dissociative identity disorder in television
Witchcraft in television
Druidry in fiction
Fiction set in the 1580s
Ghosts in television
Incest in television
Mariticide in fiction
Mass murder in fiction
Reality television series parodies
Metafictional television series
Roanoke Colony
Suicide in television
Southern Gothic television series
Television series set in the 2010s
Television shows filmed in California
Television shows filmed in Santa Clarita, California
Television shows set in North Carolina